Magdalena "Magda" Erbenová (born 9 February 2000) is a Czech ice hockey player and member of the Czech national ice hockey team, currently playing with the RPI Engineers women's ice hockey program in the ECAC Hockey conference of the NCAA Division I.

Playing career 

Her senior club career began in the Czech Women's Extraliga at age 14 with the women's representative team of HC Slavia Praha. After four seasons with HC Slavia Praha, she transferred to HC Baník Příbram for the 2018–19 Czech Women's Extraliga season. Erbenová also played in the second-tier Czech national under-16 league with HC Benátky nad Jizerou U16 and in USA Hockey's 19U Tier-1 league with the Northwood School Huskies elite girls' ice hockey team.

International play 
Erbenová made her senior national team debut at the 2021 IIHF Women's World Championship.

As a junior player with the Czech national under-18 team, she participated in the IIHF Women's U18 World Championships in 2016 and 2017, and served as team captain at the 2018 tournament. At the 2016 Winter Youth Olympics, she was the flagbearer for the Czech delegation at the opening ceremony and served as captain of the Czech girls' ice hockey team, which won a silver medal in the girls' ice hockey tournament.

Personal life 
She attended the Secondary School for the Administration of the EU in Prague for four years before relocating to Lake Placid, New York, United States to attend the Northwood School, a private boarding school, for her last year of secondary school.

In 2020, she began studying business and management at the Rensselaer Polytechnic Institute in Troy, New York and earned selection to the 2020–21 ECAC Hockey All-Academic team.

References

External links
 
 
 Magdalena Erbenová at Hokej.cz 

Living people
2000 births
Sportspeople from Mladá Boleslav
Czech women's ice hockey defencemen
RPI Engineers women's ice hockey players
Ice hockey players at the 2016 Winter Youth Olympics
Czech expatriate ice hockey players in the United States